Harney County is one of the 36 counties in the U.S. state of Oregon. As of the 2020 census, the population was 7,495, making it the sixth-least populous county in Oregon. The county seat is Burns. Established in 1889, the county is named in honor of William S. Harney, a military officer of the period, who was involved in the Pig War and popular in the Pacific Northwest.

Harney County is a rural county in southeastern Oregon. It is a five-hour drive from Portland, Oregon and a three-hour drive from Boise, Idaho. The county is bordered by Grant County (to the north), Malheur County (to the east); Washoe County, Nevada and Humboldt County, Nevada (to the south); and Lake, Deschutes, and Crook counties (to the west).

At  in size, the county is the largest in Oregon, and one of the largest in the United States; it is larger in area than six U.S. states. The county has just two incorporated cities:  Burns, the county seat and the larger city, with 40 percent of the population, and Hines, with 20 percent of the county's population. About 75 percent of the county's area is federal land, variously managed by the Bureau of Reclamation, Bureau of Land Management, U.S. Fish and Wildlife Service, and U.S. Forest Service. About 10 percent of Harney County's area is part of the Ochoco National Forest and Malheur National Forest. The county also contains the Burns Paiute Indian Reservation within and immediately north of the City of Burns; this 760-acres reservation of the Burns Paiute Tribe is a remnant of the former Malheur Indian Reservation.

Harney County has a "high desert" topography, with low levels of precipitation. About 500 ranches and farms producing cattle, dairy products and hay operate within the county; in the county, cattle outnumber people 14-to-1. Besides ranching and farming, forestry evolves important industries in the county.

The county is of ecological as well as recreational importance. Along with neighboring Grant County, Harney County has the nation's largest Ponderosa pine forest. The county was also a focus of recent efforts to conserve the sage grouse; in 2014, Harney County ranchers signed 30-year agreements with the federal government to protect the sage grouse. Visitors are attracted to the county for its hunting, fishing, and camping activities.

According to the website of the Harney County Sheriff's Office, the sheriff has a staff of six law enforcement officers.  Burns has a separate police department but, as of 2008, did not employ enough officers to provide "24-hour" coverage.

History
The Native Americans living in this region at the time of the Lewis and Clark Expedition were the Northern Paiute, who fought with the Tenino and Wasco peoples. Peter Skene Ogden was the first known European to explore this area in 1826 when he led a fur brigade for the Hudson's Bay Company.

Harney County was carved out of the southern two-thirds of Grant County on February 25, 1889. A fierce political battle, with armed "night riders" who spirited county records from Harney to Burns, ended with Burns as the county seat in 1890.

The Malheur River Indian Reservation was created by executive order on March 14, 1871, and the Northern Paiute within the Oregon state boundaries were settled there. The federal government "discontinued" the reservation after the Bannock War of 1878. Descendants of these people form a federally recognized tribal entity, the Burns Paiute Tribe, which had 341 members in 2008. Fewer than 35.5% of the tribal members live on the Burns Paiute Indian Colony near Burns. The tribe formerly earned revenue from a small casino, the Old Camp Casino, before its closure in 2012, and renting out communal tribal lands for grazing rights to local ranchers.

The first white people to arrive through Harney County were French explorers, circa 1750ː Narceese Charbonneau (father of Toussaint Charbonneau), LaValle and a priest named Joseph Nadeau. The men came aboard a Spanish supply ship and left from San Diego on a transcontinental tour to Quebec. Instead of reaching Canada, the men arrived at southern Harney County and continued towards Idaho. In the late 1820s, Peter Skene Ogden made a description of the natural features and Indian culture from Klamath County to Harney County, following the Sylvaille River, and turning up afterwards towards Walla Walla leading a fur brigade for Hudson's Bay Company.

2016 militia occupation

On January 2, 2016, the headquarters building of the Malheur National Wildlife Refuge was seized by armed protesters related to the Bundy standoff. The group protested the prison sentences of two ranchers convicted of arson in wildfires set in 2001 and 2006, which the ranchers claimed spread from their land into the wildlife reserve. Militia leaders, including Ammon Bundy and Jon Ritzheimer, were arrested on January 26, 2016, in an event that included the shooting of militant LaVoy Finicum. The following day, only four militants remained, and they surrendered on February 11, 2016.

Geography

It is the largest county in Oregon by area and the tenth-largest county in the United States (excluding boroughs and census areas in Alaska).

To its southeast is the Alvord Desert—the driest place in Oregon—and the Trout Creek Mountains, which extend south into Nevada. South of Steens Mountain, the Pueblo Mountains are another remote range in Oregon and Nevada. North of Steens Mountain lies the Harney Basin, which contains Malheur Lake and Harney Lake.

Adjacent counties
 Crook County - northwest
 Grant County - north
 Malheur County - east/Mountain Time Border
 Humboldt County, Nevada - south
 Washoe County, Nevada - southwest
 Lake County - west
 Deschutes County - northwest

Time Zones

Although the county is officially in the Pacific Time Zone, unincorporated Drewsey, just west of the Malheur County line unofficially observes the Mountain Time Zone.

National protected areas
Malheur National Forest (part)
Malheur National Wildlife Refuge
Ochoco National Forest (part)

Demographics

2000 census
As of the census of 2000, there were 7,609 people, 3,036 households, and 2,094 families residing in the county. The population density was 1 people per square mile (0/km2). There were 3,533 housing units at an average density of 0 per square mile (0/km2). The racial makeup of the county was 91.93% White, 3.97% Native American, 0.51% Asian, 0.13% Black or African American, 0.07% Pacific Islander, 1.30% from other races, and 2.09% from two or more races. 4.15% of the population were Hispanic or Latino of any race. 21.1% were of German, 11.1% American, 10.3% Irish and 9.7% English ancestry.

There is a small, but significant Spanish Basque community.

Approximately 75% of the population of Harney County lives in the Burns-Hines municipal district. Crane is the only other localised population center, with less than 7% of the population of Harney County. Lawen and Riley have no localised populations. The remaining population of Harney County is dispersed throughout the countryside, mostly dwelling on large ranches.

There were 3,036 households, out of which 29.40% had children under the age of 18 living with them, 58.00% were married couples living together, 6.80% had a female householder with no husband present, and 31.00% were non-families. 25.90% of all households were made up of individuals, and 10.20% had someone living alone who was 65 years of age or older. The average household size was 2.45 and the average family size was 2.94.

In the county, the population was spread out, with 26.00% under the age of 18, 6.40% from 18 to 24, 26.60% from 25 to 44, 26.10% from 45 to 64, and 15.00% who were 65 years of age or older. The median age was 40 years. For every 100 females there were 102.90 males. For every 100 females age 18 and over, there were 98.20 males.

The median income for a household in the county was $30,957, and the median income for a family was $36,917. Males had a median income of $27,386 versus $21,773 for females. The per capita income for the county was $16,159. About 8.60% of families and 11.80% of the population were below the poverty line, including 12.70% of those under age 18 and 13.90% of those age 65 or over.

2010 census
As of the 2010 census, there were 7,422 people, 3,205 households, and 2,069 families residing in the county. The racial makeup of the county was 91.9% white, 3.1% American Indian, 0.5% Asian, 0.3% black or African American, 1.3% from other races, and 3.0% from two or more races. Those of Hispanic or Latino origin made up 4.0% of the population. In terms of ancestry, 28.7% were German, 18.6% were English, 15.0% were Irish, 6.7% were Scottish, 5.1% were Dutch, and 4.5% were American.

Of the 3,205 households, 26.4% had children under the age of 18 living with them, 52.0% were married couples living together, 8.8% had a female householder with no husband present, 35.4% were non-families, and 30.0% of all households were made up of individuals. The average household size was 2.28 and the average family size was 2.81. The median age was 45.2 years.

The median income for a household in the county was $39,036 and the median income for a family was $46,626. Males had a median income of $40,218 versus $31,046 for females. The per capita income for the county was $20,849. About 14.1% of families and 18.5% of the population were below the poverty line, including 27.5% of those under age 18 and 9.2% of those age 65 or over.

Communities

Cities
Burns (county seat)
Hines

Census-designated place
Crane

Unincorporated communities

Buchanan
Denio
Diamond
Drewsey
Dunnean
Fields
Frenchglen
Frost Mill
Harney
Indian Village
Lawen
New Princeton
Riley
Suntex
Trout Creek
Van
Venator
Voltage
Wagontire
Whitehorse Ranch

Ghost towns
Andrews
Blitzen
Narrows

Politics
Like most counties in eastern Oregon, the majority of registered voters who are part of a political party in Harney County are members of the Republican Party. No Democrat has carried Harney County in a presidential election since Lyndon Johnson in 1964. The last time a Democrat was even close to carrying Harney County in a presidential election was Jimmy Carter in 1976 when he lost it by 85 votes. Since 2000, every Republican nominee has received at least 70% of the vote in Harney County in presidential elections. In the 2008 presidential election 70.45% of Harney County voters voted for Republican John McCain, while 25.79% voted for Democrat Barack Obama and 3.73% of voters either voted for a Third Party candidate or wrote in a candidate. These numbers show a slight shift towards the Democratic candidate when compared to the 2004 presidential election, in which 76% of Harney Country voters voted for George W. Bush, while 22.7% voted for John Kerry, and 1.3% of voters either voted for a Third Party candidate or wrote in a candidate. In 1992, the incumbent, George H. W. Bush won with 40.84% of the vote, over Ross Perot, who finished second with 30.37%, and Bill Clinton, who finished third with 28.86%.

Economy
Three industries have traditionally provided the county's economic base: ranching, sheep raising, and timber. The railroad, which extended into the area in 1883, served as a catalyst to the cattle industry but later contributed to its decline. By bringing farmers and sheep men to the area, it created increased competition for productive land. Harvesting and breeding of wild horses was lucrative for a period. Harney County shares the largest Ponderosa Pine forest in the nation with Grant County. Its abundance of game, numerous campsites and excellent fishing have stimulated fast-growing recreational activities.

Facilitated on the national level by the Carey act of 1894, arid land in Harney County was donated to the state for irrigation and settlement, but all water development efforts failed.

Eventually all land claims filed under the reclamation legislation were abandoned or nullified. Malheur National Wildlife Refuge was established in 1908 and expanded in 1936. The refuge now includes . Borax has been mined in the Steens area, and uranium has been found on its south side.

Education
School districts include:
 K-12: Harney County School District 3 (Burns and Hines)
 High school: Harney County Union High School District 1J
 Elementary school districts
 Harney County School District 4 (Crane Elementary)
 Diamond School District 7
 Double O School District 28
 Drewsey School District 13
 South Harney School District 33 (Fields)
 Frenchglen School District 16
 Pine Creek School District 5
 Suntex School District 10

The county formerly had the Trout Creek School, which in 1969 had two students, making it the smallest school by enrollment in the state.

Harney County is not in a community college district but has a "contract out of district" (COD) with Treasure Valley Community College. TVCC operates the Burns Outreach Center in Burns.

The Harney County Library is located in Burns.

See also

National Register of Historic Places listings in Harney County, Oregon

Footnotes

Further reading
 George Francis Brimlow, Harney County, Oregon, and Its Range Land. Burns, OR: Gail Graphics, 1980.
 Dorsey Griffin, Starting at the Narrows: A History of Harney County, Oregon. Netarts, OR: Griffin Press, 1990.
 Harney County Chamber of Commerce, A Lively Little History of Harney County: A Centennial Souvenir Album, 1889-1989. Burns, OR : Harney County Chamber of Commerce, 1989.
 Harney County Historical Society, Harney County Historical Highlights. Burns, OR: Harney County Historical Society & Museum, 1997. —Periodical.
 Royal G. Jackson and Jennifer A. Lee, Harney County: An Historical Inventory. Burns, OR: Harney County Historical Society, 1978.
 Margaret Justine Lo Piccolo, Some Aspects of the Range Cattle Industry of Harney County, Oregon, 1870–1900. MA thesis. University of Oregon, 1962.
 Karen Nitz and Claire McGill Luce, Harney County. San Francisco, CA: Arcadia Pub., 2008.
 Peter K. Simpson, The Community of Cattlemen: A Social History of the Cattle Industry in Southeastern Oregon, 1869–1912. Moscow, D: University of Idaho Press, 1987.
 
 An Illustrated History of Baker, Grant, Malheur and Harney Counties, with a Brief Outline of the Early History of the State of Oregon. Chicago: Western Historical Publishing Company, 1902.

External links

 
1889 establishments in Oregon
Basque-American culture in Oregon
Populated places established in 1889